The Slaughter Yard (Spanish El matadero, title often imprecisely translated as The Slaughterhouse), is a short story by the Argentine poet and essayist Esteban Echeverría (1805–1851). It was the first Argentine work of prose fiction. It is one of the most studied texts in Latin American literature. Written in exile and published posthumously in 1871, it is an attack on the brutality of the Federalist regime of Juan Manuel de Rosas and his parapolice thugs, the Mazorca.

Text
The text in the first uniform<ref group = "note">Gutierrez had previously published the story in the magazine Revista del Río de la Plata.</ref> edition of Echeverría's works (ed. Gutiérrez together with Gutiérrez's editorial commentary) may be downloaded from the Internet Archive. A printed English translation by Norman Thomas di Giovanni has been published.

The following is an English-language précis of the original Spanish text.

Plot
The action takes place on some unspecified date in the 1830s during the season of Lent. The City of Buenos Aires has been isolated by floods. Pounding their pulpits, the preachers thunder that the Day of Judgement is nigh; that God is angry with the wickedness of man – and, more especially, with the heretical unitarios (adherents of the proscribed Unitario political party).

Eventually the floods abate but not before the city has run out of beef. The government gives orders that 50 bullocks are to be slaughtered, ostensibly to provide beef for children and the sick (for otherwise meat is forbidden to Catholics during Lent). The reader is given to understand that the meat is really intended for privileged persons including Rosas himself and his corrupt clergy.
 
Echeverría proceeds to paint the slaughter yard scene in lurid colours: in the pens, the cattle stuck in the glutinous mud; the blood-smeared, half-naked butchers – brutal men, staunch Rosas supporters to a man; the hideous black female offal-scavengers; the growling mastiffs; the screaming carrion birds; the riotous youths who amuse themselves by pelting the females and each other with lumps of bloody meat or guts; the cynical, bestial language.

On a ruinous shed there are signboards declaiming: "Long live the Federation"; "Long live the Restorer and the heroine doña Encarnación Ezcurra"; "Death to the savage unitarios". Presiding there is the sinister Judge of the Slaughter Yard. By order of Rosas the Judge enjoys absolute power over this collection of debased humanity.
 
Forty-nine bullocks are slaughtered, flayed and quartered with axes. One more animal remains. But there is a suspicion that he may be no bullock, but a bull – though bulls are not allowed in the slaughter yard. Driven mad with rage by the crowd's handling, he charges. A horseman lassoes him but owing to an accident the taut lasso decapitates a child. The animal escapes and heads off to the city, pursued by a crowd, which, incidentally, tramples a passing Englishman. After an hour the animal is recaptured, taken back to the slaughter yard and despatched in horrific terms by the butcher Matasiete (the name means braggart, bully, literally "he kills seven"). The "bullock" is then cut open and proves after all to possess an enormous pair of retracted testicles – much to the amusement of the crowd, which by now has forgotten the decapitated boy.
 
At this point the chief protagonist, who is never named but is a man of about 25, enters the scene. The crowd immediately spots that he is a unitario (supporter of the proscribed political party). His sideburns are cut in the form of a letter U (for unitario); he is not displaying the mandatory rosista emblem; neither is he wearing the obligatory mourning for Rosas' late wife. (It is not explained why the protagonist has chosen to ride about Buenos Aires dressed in this illegal, indeed reckless manner.) Furthermore, his horse bears a silla or gringo saddle – in the crowd's mentality, the sure sign of the effete city slicker.

Egged on by the crowd, Matasiete throws him from his horse, seizes him by the necktie and holds a dagger to his throat.
 
"Cut his throat, Matasiete" jeers the crowd. At that point the slaughter yard Judge rides up and orders that the protagonist be taken to his shed, which is also a rudimentary courtroom. In this room is a massive table never without glasses of grog and playing cards "unless to make room for the executions and tortures of the Federalist thugs of the slaughter yard". After the crowd has shouted threats and ribald insults the Judge orders everyone to shut up and sit down.
 
There then transpires an angry dialogue between (on the one hand) the Judge and taunting crowd and (on the other) the defiant, brave but rather high-minded protagonist. The Judge and the crowd speak in direct, colloquial street Spanish but, curiously, the protagonist, even when insulting them, uses correct literary language, addressing them in the third person.

At last the Judge delivers his ruling: "Drop this city slicker's underpants and give him the verge to his bald buttocks". The reader is assumed to understand the inward significance of the word Mazorca (mazorca is Spanish for "corncob": the corncob is the Mazorca's chosen instrument of torture by rectal insertion). The protagonist is violently stretched out on the torture-table and he develops paroxysms of uncontrollable rage, demanding to have his throat cut rather than submit to this indignity.

After a terrible struggle the young man bursts a blood vessel and dies on the spot. The Judge comments: "Poor devil; we only wanted to amuse ourselves, but he took it too seriously."

Significance in Latin American literature
According to the American editor, translator and Borges collaborator Norman Thomas di Giovanni, "Esteban Echeverría’s El matadero, written towards the end of the 1830s, is chronologically the first work of Argentine prose fiction…. Owing in part to its brevity – a mere 6,000 or so words – it may be the most studied school text in all Latin American literature. It is certainly known and acclaimed beyond the borders of Argentina."

For Borges himself, who wrote a foreword to one edition, "In Echeverría's text there is a sort of hallucinatory realism, which can recall the great shadows of Hugo and Herman Melville".

"If one text has exercised a decisive influence in Argentine literature and art, it seems to be The Slaughter Yard, spearhead of a large number of editions and studies, and seed of a still-prevailing movement where new readings and meanings are sought."

A 1998 survey of U.S. universities found the work was required graduate reading at 73% of Ph.D.-granting Spanish faculties, the highest score for any Spanish American nineteenth century work of fiction.Brown and Johnson obtained results for the 56 top-rated faculties. (They mistakenly classified El matadero as a novel instead of a short story, but it would have scored top in either category.)

Echeverría's oeuvre extends to five printed volumes, but his literary prestige chiefly depends on this single short story.

Historicity
Although The Slaughter Yard is a story, it is based on some elements of fact. English-speaking memorialists described the setting (the south Matadero shown in the Vidal image) and their accounts corroborate many of Echeverría's details.Hudson, 286-7. The clergy indeed upheld Rosas' dictatorship. It was indeed compulsory to display rosista emblems including "Death to the savage unitarios. The butchers in the slaughter yards were indeed staunch Rosas supporters and did supply thugs for his Mazorca. The Mazorca did use the corncob as an instrument of torture. Further, according to Gutiérrez
The scene of the "savage unitario" in the power of the Judge of the Slaughter Yard and his myrmidons is not an invention but a reality that happened more than once in that ill-fated era. The only thing in this picture that can have been the author's invention would be the moral appreciation of the circumstances, the language and the victim's conduct, which functions as the noble poet would have done himself in an analogous situation.

Writing and publication
Traditional view
It is usually said that Echeverría wrote "The Slaughter Yard" at some time in 1838-40. Although he had fled to Uruguay the long arm of Rosas could still reach him there; according to Echeverría's friend Juan María Gutiérrez, who was afterwards rector of the University of Buenos Aires, "If the story had fallen into the hands of Rosas its author would have disappeared immediately." Gutiérrez, who said he personally examined the manuscript, added:

He well knew the risk he was running, but it could have been rage, more than fear, that produced his trembling handwriting , which is almost illegible in the original manuscript.

It was Gutiérrez who edited the work for publication in 1871.

Challenge to the traditional view

That Echeverría did not publish the story because he feared assassination even in Uruguay was denied by Cabañas, who pointed out that Echeverría did publish other works which, he claimed, were equally offensive. Rather, the story did not fit Echeverría's aesthetic sensibility.

The traditional view as to dating and authorship was challenged by Emilio Carilla in 1993. Carilla acknowledged that Gutiérrez had a venerable reputation as a man of letters. But he pointed out that Gutierrez had a habit of unilaterally "correcting" the works of the authors he edited (for editors of that era, his was a not uncommon failing); supplying copious examples. He also noted that – according to his own admission: in a private letter to Alberdi – Gutiérrez wrote and published a detailed book review of Sarmiento's Facundo before he had read the book! As regards "The Slaughter Yard", said Carilla:

The manuscript of the story has never been found.
It cannot be found amongst Gutierrez's collection of Echeverría's papers. 
There is no positive evidence that the manuscript was ever seen by anyone, apart from Gutiérrez and (presumably) Echeverría himself.
Therefore, critics have had to take Gutierrez's text and account on trust.
Before 1871, when discussing Echeverría's works, Gutierrez not so much as mentioned the most important item: "The Slaughter Yard". Presumably, he did not acquire the MS until about that year.
In his own writings Echeverría never mentioned "The Slaughter Yard" either.

Therefore, for Carilla, it was surprising that critics had assumed "The Slaughter Yard" was composed around 1838-40: that was merely the time in which the story was set. It could equally well have been written at any time up to Echeverría's death in 1851 – shortly before the dictator Rosas was overthrown. Hence, although it was tempting to regard "The Slaughter House" as a work composed at the height of Rosas' state terrorism, there was really no evidence that it was.

Carllla then turned to Gutierrez's editorial notes on the story. According to Gutierrez, the manuscript had not been intended for publication but as a sketch for a poem Echeverría had intended to write, "as is proved by the haste and carelessness with which it had been drawn up". But that, said Carilla, is absurd, for the published text of "The Slaughter Yard" is pretty well flawless. We may therefore suspect that Gutierrez himself had to do with the composition of the story. And the proof is in the story's last paragraph:

In those days the throat-cutting butchers of the Slaughter Yard were the advocates who spread the rosista Federation by rod and dagger ... They used to call a savage unitario ... anyone who was not a cutthroat, butcher, nor savage, nor thief, every decent man with a good heart, every enlightened patriot friend of light and liberty ...

That, said Carilla, must have been written after the Rosas dictatorship, and by Gutierrez himself. Gutiérrez was a collaborator, a joint author of "The Slaughter Yard".

Genre

There is endless discussion about the literary type or genre to which "The Slaughter House" belongs: story, novel of manners, essay or hybrid. For German scholar Christian Wehr, "The Slaughter Yard" is the foundational text of an autochthonous Latin American genre he called Diktatorenromans : the dictator novel.

Vernacular dialogue

As noted, the protagonist speaks in elite literary Spanish but the slaughter yard denizens (including the Judge) use the direct street Spanish of low class Buenos Aires. "The Slaughter Yard" is the first work to record this argot. It may be fruitfully compared with the vernacular Spanish of the city that is in use today, long after the massive Italo-Hispanic immigrations of the early twentieth century. The text appears to be the first to record the typical Argentine interjection "che".

Readings and symbolism

In its immediate or obvious meaning it is simply a story of biting political criticism: almost as obvious is the symbolism of the slaughter yard as a microcosm of Rosas' polity where, but for the hero and the one bull who does have cojones, all are easily controlled. However all sorts of interpretations or symbolic meanings have been sought: Freudian,Sorbille, 2009, 94. as a necessary ritual sacrifice, as an item in "Argentina's necrophilic catalogue", as a racist attack on Rosas' Afro-Argentines, from a feminist perspective, and as Echeverría's (and indeed his political school's) crisis of masculinity.

Notes

References

Works cited
 
 
 
 
 
 
 Di Giovanni, The Slaughteryard Project,  accessed 19 November 2015.
 Di Meglio, Gabriel. ¡Mueran los salvajes unitarios! La mazorca y la política en tiempos de Rosas (Penguin Random House Grupo Editorial Argentina, Buenos Aires, 2012).
 
 Gutiérrez, J.M., notes to El Matadero, in Echeverría, Esteban, Obras Completas, volume V (Carlos Casavalle, Buenos Aires, 1874).
 Hadfield, William, Brazil, the River Plate and the Falkland Islands (Longman, Brown, Green and Longmans, London, 1854).
 
 Hudson, William Henry, Far Away and Long Ago: A History of My Early Life, (J.M. Dent and Sons Ltd, London and Toronto, 1918).
 Hutchinson, Thomas Joseph. Buenos Ayres and Argentine Gleanings, (Edward Stanford, London, 1865.)
 Lynch, John, Argentine Caudillo: Juan Manuel de Rosas (Lanham, Maryland, 2001)
 
 
 
 
 
 Vidal, Emeric Essex, Picturesque Illustrations of Buenos Ayres and Monte Video'', (R. Ackerman, London, 1820).
 

Juan Manuel de Rosas
Latin American literature
Argentine literature
Argentine short stories
Political repression in Argentina
19th century in Argentina
Fiction set in the 1830s